Franz Plank (26 December 1897 – 10 February 1962) was an Austrian footballer. He played in one match for the Austria national football team in 1922.

References

External links
 

1897 births
1962 deaths
Austrian footballers
Austria international footballers
Place of birth missing
Association footballers not categorized by position